This is a list of cultural and technical festivals held in Indian Institutes of Technology (IITs), National Institutes of Technology (NITs) and Indian Institutes of Information Technology (IIITs) throughout India. Some colleges may combine these festivals with sports or other activities, while others may hold separate sports festivals.

Indian Institutes of Technology (IITs)

National Institutes of Technology (NITs)

Indian Institutes of Information Technology (IIITs)

See also
List of cultural festivals in Indian colleges

References
5.   Articles   The Economic Time has Published it 05 August 2022 

Technology
 01
L
L
L
cultural technical Iit
India, technology